More… is the third studio album by American country music artist Trace Adkins. It was released on November 2, 1999 on Capitol Nashville. It features the singles "Don't Lie", "More", and "I'm Gonna Love You Anyway", which respectively reached No. 27, No. 10, and No. 36 on the Hot Country Songs charts. It was also the only album of his career not to achieve a RIAA certification – Trey Bruce produced all but two of the album's tracks. "Don't Lie" was produced by Paul Worley, while "All Hat, No Cattle" was produced by Ray Benson of Asleep at the Wheel.

The album's release date was advanced due to initial radio demand for "Don't Lie".

Track listing

Personnel
Adapted from liner notes.

Trace Adkins - lead vocals
Ray Benson - acoustic guitar (track 11), background vocals (track 11)
Chris Booher - piano (track 11)
Pat Buchanan - electric guitar solo (track 3), slide guitar (track 4)
Cindy Cashdollar - steel guitar (track 11)
Joe Chemay - bass guitar (track 6)
J.T. Corenflos - electric guitar, gut string guitar (track 12)
Eric Darken - percussion (tracks 3, 4, 9, 12)
Floyd Domino - piano (track 11)
Michael Francis - saxophone (track 11)
Larry Franklin - fiddle (track 6)
Johnny Gimble - fiddle (track 11)
Rob Hajacos - fiddle
Tony Harrell - B-3 organ, piano, keyboards, Wurlitzer (track 2)
Wes Hightower - background vocals (all tracks except 11)
Steve Hinson - steel guitar, lap steel guitar
John Hobbs - B-3 organ (track 6), piano (track 6), synthesizer (track 6)
Troy Johnson - background vocals (track 6)
Liana Manis - background vocals (tracks 1, 3, 4, 7, 8, 12)
Brent Mason - electric guitar (track 2)
David Earl Miller - bass guitar (track 11), background vocals (track 11)
Greg Morrow - drums
Alison Prestwood - bass guitar (tracks 2, 8)
Jason Roberts - fiddle (track 11), electric guitar (track 11)
David Sanger - drums (track 11)
Brian D. Siewert - synthesizer (tracks 4, 7)
Michael Spriggs - acoustic guitar
Glenn Worf - bass guitar
Paul Worley - acoustic guitar (track 6)
Curtis Wright - background vocals (tracks 2, 5, 9, 10)
Jonathan Yudkin - fiddle (tracks 8, 9, 10), fiddle solo (track 4), mandolin (track 7)

Strings performed by the Siewert String Thing, arranged and conducted by Brian D. Siewert.

Chart performance

Album

Singles

References

1999 albums
Trace Adkins albums
Capitol Records albums